Li Li also known as L'i Li-fen is a former international table tennis player from China.

Table tennis career
From 1965 to 1972 she won several medals in singles, doubles, and team events in the Asian Table Tennis Championships and in the World Table Tennis Championships.

Her five World Championship medals included one gold medal in the mixed doubles with Liang Geliang at the 1973 World Table Tennis Championships.

See also
 List of table tennis players
 List of World Table Tennis Championships medalists

References

Chinese female table tennis players
Table tennis players from Beijing
20th-century Chinese women